Joseph de Graft Hayford (1840–1919) was a Wesleyan Methodist minister who was a prominent figure in Fante politics and society in the Gold Coast. He was one of the founders of the Fante Confederation of 1867 and one of the first political detainees in Ghanaian history.

Background
Rev. Joseph de Graft Hayford has been described as "one of the greatest politicians of his day, and the most active member of the Fanti Confederacy of 1867". When the Confederacy was declared illegal, he was one of the four leaders to be arrested on a charge of conspiracy, the others being James Hutton Brew, James F. Amissah and George Kunto Blankson.

Family
Of the Anona clan of Cape Coast, he was the son of Rev. James Hayford and Elizabeth de Graft. He was the husband of Mary Ewuraba Brew (daughter of the prominent Gold Coast trader Samuel Collins Brew and Adjuah Esson) and his children were: Rev. Josiah Hayford, Isaac Hayford, Ibinijah Hayford, Rev. Dr Ernest James Hayford, Rev. Mark Christian Hayford, Joseph Ephraim Casely Hayford, Hester Hayford; Helen Mary Hayford and Sydney Spencer Hayford. He was the brother of Rev. Isaac Hayford and Lucy Hayford.

References

1840 births
1919 deaths
Gold Coast (British colony) people
Fante people
Casely-Hayford family
Methodist ministers
Ghanaian clergy
Ghanaian Methodists
Ghanaian people of English descent